Bas van Duivenbode (11 March 1940 – 24 September 2015) was a Dutch boxer. He competed in the men's light middleweight event at the 1960 Summer Olympics.

References

1940 births
2015 deaths
Dutch male boxers
Olympic boxers of the Netherlands
Boxers at the 1960 Summer Olympics
Boxers from Amsterdam
Light-middleweight boxers